The white-cheeked cotinga (Zaratornis stresemanni) is a species of bird in the family Cotingidae. It is monotypic within the genus Zaratornis. It is endemic to the Andes in west-central Peru. It mainly occurs at altitudes 3,250-4,250 m.a.s.l. in woodlands dominated by Polylepis and Gynoxys. It primarily feeds on mistletoe berries. It is threatened by habitat destruction and consequently considered vulnerable by BirdLife International and IUCN.

References

External links
BirdLife Species Factsheet

white-cheeked cotinga
Birds of the Peruvian Andes
Endemic birds of Peru
white-cheeked cotinga
Taxonomy articles created by Polbot